Christian Vincent  (born 9 February 1980) is an Emmy nominated Canadian-American professional dancer, choreographer, actor and model. His most notable roles are his appearances as Connor Martin in the Hallmark Christmas film," A Majestic Christmas," and as Ricky on the former LOGO Viacom television series Noah's Arc.

Early life and education
While growing up in Windsor, Ontario, in grade school he attended Sandwich West Public School in LaSalle, Ontario.  Vincent had several interests as a child, ranging from karate to painting and drawing.  He later discovered his passion for dance and eventually enrolled at Butler University, where he graduated Cum Laude, with a BFA degree. He also earned an MFA, from The University of California, Irvine.

Career
After college, Vincent later moved to Los Angeles to pursue a career as a dancer and choreographer.  As a dancer, Vincent has toured and performed with Madonna, Ashanti, Gloria Estefan, Geri Halliwell, Prince, Ricky Martin, Shakira, and Britney Spears. Early on in his career he danced in various commercials including commercials for Bellsouth, as well as one for Oral-B. Christian was also a background dancer in Madonna's "Don't Tell Me" music video

Vincent danced in numerous films and TV show including, "Dancing with The Stars,"She's All That, Rent, Starsky & Hutch, Buffy the Vampire Slayer, Arrested Development, MADtv, George Lopez, Baywatch, Cold Case,and  "G.I Joe Retaliation."
Christian has choreographed and coached dance extensively for TV and film.  He began professionally, when he choreographed several commercials for Target. Vincent was a co-star and choreographer for the reality TV show Canada Sings, and he was the dance coach for Sally Hawkins for Guillermo Del Toro's film The Shape of Water. Vincent choreographed Netflix's biopic of Madame C.J Walker, starring Octavia Spencer entitled "Self Made," in which he was nominated for a World Choreography Award. Christian also choreographed Lifetime's biopic on Salt-N-Pepa and The Christmas Dance Reunion. Most recently, Christian was nominated by the Television Academy for an Emmy Award. His work was recognized in the category of Outstanding Choreography for Scripted programming, for the CBC/BET series The Porter. This was a history-making nomination, as it was the first time year that BET received any major scripted series nominations. 

As an actor, Vincent appeared in the ABC Family miniseries Fallen as Michael the Archangel, "Fringe,"  "Continuum," Smallville," Noah's Arc: Jumping the Broom," Center Stage: Turn It Up, "Noah's Arc," Hallmark's, "A Majestic Christmas," and most recently City TV's series "The Wedding Planners and the yet to be released "The Christmas Dance Reunion."

He also appeared in the October 2012 issue of PMc Magazine by celebrity photographer Patrick McMullan. In addition to his work in entertainment, Vincent is a professor at The Glorya Kaufman School of Dance at the University of Southern California.

Personal
Vincent lives in Los Angeles, California.

Filmography

Film

Television

References

External links
 
 Christian Vincent
 Facebook page
 Christian Vincent PMc Magazine interview
 Christian Vincent Interview on The Morning Show in Toronto, Canada

1974 births
1980 births
Living people
Male actors from Windsor, Ontario
Black Canadian male actors
Canadian choreographers
Canadian male dancers
Canadian emigrants to the United States
Canadian male film actors
Canadian male television actors
Black Canadian dancers